Kolbjørn Kvam (20 October 1865 – 11 March 1933) was a Norwegian sports shooter. He competed in two events at the 1908 Summer Olympics.

References

External links
 

1865 births
1933 deaths
People from Ringsaker
Norwegian male sport shooters
Olympic shooters of Norway
Shooters at the 1908 Summer Olympics
Sportspeople from Innlandet